Ferris Bueller's Day Off is a 1986 American teen comedy film written, co-produced, and directed by John Hughes and co-produced by Tom Jacobson. The film stars Matthew Broderick, Mia Sara, and Alan Ruck with supporting roles by Jennifer Grey, Jeffrey Jones, Cindy Pickett, Edie McClurg, and Lyman Ward. It tells the story of a high school slacker who skips school with his best friend and his girlfriend for a day in Chicago and regularly breaks the fourth wall to explain his techniques and inner thoughts.

Hughes wrote the screenplay in less than a week. Filming began in September 1985 and finished in November, featuring many Chicago landmarks including the then Sears Tower, Wrigley Field and the Art Institute of Chicago. The film was Hughes's love letter to Chicago: "I really wanted to capture as much of Chicago as I could. Not just in the architecture and landscape, but the spirit."

Released by Paramount Pictures on June 11, 1986, the film became the tenth-highest-grossing film of 1986 in the United States, grossing $70 million over a $5 million budget. The film received acclaim from critics and audiences alike, who praised Broderick's performance, the humor, and the tone.

In 2014, the film was selected for preservation in the United States National Film Registry by the Library of Congress, being deemed "culturally, historically, or aesthetically significant." The film was followed by a television series, starring Charlie Schlatter as title character. A spin-off film titled Sam & Victor's Day Off, focusing on the two valets who took Cameron's father's Ferrari on a joy ride, is in development for Paramount+.

Plot
In a Chicago suburb one month before graduation, high school senior Ferris Bueller fakes illness to stay home from school. His parents believe he is ill, though his sister Jeannie does not. After learning Ferris stayed home for the day, the Dean of Students Ed Rooney is determined to expose Ferris's chronic truancy.

Ferris persuades his hypochondriac best friend Cameron Frye to help excuse Ferris's girlfriend Sloane Peterson from school on the grounds that her grandmother died. To complete the ruse that Sloane's father is picking her up from school, Ferris borrows Cameron's father's 1961 Ferrari 250 GT California Spyder. Cameron, who is afraid of his father's wrath, is dismayed when Ferris decides to take the car on a day trip into Chicago. Ferris promises they will return the car as it was, including preserving the original odometer mileage.

The trio leave the car with parking attendants, who promptly go on a long joyride. The three explore the city, with Ferris taking care to stay out of view from his father. They visit the Art Institute of Chicago, use deception to dine at an upscale restaurant, go to a Chicago Cubs baseball game, and attend the Von Steuben Day Parade, with Ferris jumping on a float and performing "Twist and Shout" by the Beatles.

Rooney prowls the Bueller home for Ferris, becoming victim to several pratfalls. Jeannie skips class and returns home to confront Ferris, but finds Rooney instead. Shocked by his appearance, she knocks him unconscious and calls the police. Rooney regains consciousness and leaves, and the police arrest Jeannie for making a false report.

Upon collecting the Ferrari and heading home, Ferris and Cameron discover that the car's mileage has gone up significantly. Cameron becomes semi-catatonic from shock, but wakes up after falling into a pool. Back at Cameron's house, Ferris jacks up the car and runs it in reverse to rewind the odometer. This fails, and Cameron destroys the car out of anger over his domineering father. Ferris offers to take the blame, but Cameron declines, deciding to stand up to his father.

After walking Sloane home, Ferris realizes his parents will be returning soon. He races on foot through the neighborhood, but is nearly hit by Jeannie who is driving their mother home. Jeannie fails to get her mother to notice Ferris. Ferris makes it home first, but Rooney confronts him before he can get back inside. Seeing the two through the window, Jeannie has a change of heart and allows Ferris to come inside, claiming that Ferris was at the hospital for his illness. As Rooney flees from Ferris's Rottweiler, Ferris rushes back to his bedroom to await his parents. They find him in bed and believe he has been there all day, further suggesting to take the next day off as well.

Cast

John Hughes made his final on-screen appearance in a cameo role as a man running between the cabs, but was uncredited.

Production

Writing
As he was writing the film in 1985, John Hughes kept track of his progress in a spiral-bound logbook. He noted that the basic storyline was developed on February 25 and was successfully pitched the following day to Paramount Studios chief Ned Tanen. Tanen was intrigued by the concept, but wary that the Writers Guild of America was hours away from picketing the studio. Hughes wrote the screenplay in less than a week. Editor Paul Hirsch explained that Hughes had a trance-like concentration to his script-writing process, working for hours on end, and would later shoot the film on essentially what was his first draft of the script. "The first cut of Ferris Bueller's Day Off ended up at two hours, 45 minutes. The shortening of the script had to come in the cutting room", said Hirsch. "Having the story episodic and taking place in one day...meant the characters were wearing the same clothes. I suspect that Hughes writes his scripts with few, if any costume changes just so he can have that kind of freedom in the editing."

Hughes intended to focus more on the characters rather than the plot. "I know how the movie begins, I know how it ends", said Hughes. "I don't ever know the rest, but that doesn't seem to matter. It's not the events that are important, it's the characters going through the event. Therefore, I make them as full and real as I can. This time around, I wanted to create a character who could handle everyone and everything."

Edward McNally was rumored as the inspiration for the character Ferris Bueller. McNally grew up on the same street as Hughes, had a best friend named "Buehler", and was relentlessly pursued by the school dean over his truancy, which amounted to 27 days absent, compared to Bueller's 9 in the film.

Casting
Hughes said that he had Broderick in mind when he wrote the screenplay, saying Broderick was the only actor he could think of who could pull off the role, calling him clever and charming. "Certain guys would have played Ferris and you would have thought, 'Where's my wallet?'" Hughes said. "I had to have that look; that charm had to come through. Jimmy Stewart could have played Ferris at 15...I needed Matthew."  Anthony Michael Hall, who had worked with Hughes on three previous films, was offered the part but turned it down as he was busy with other projects. Other actors who were considered for the role included Jim Carrey, John Cusack, Johnny Depp, Tom Cruise, and Michael J. Fox.

Sara surprised Hughes when she auditioned for the role of Sloane Peterson.
"It was funny," she said. "He didn't know how old I was and said he wanted an older girl to play the 17-year-old. He said it would take someone older to give her the kind of dignity she needed. He almost fell out of his chair when I told him I was only 18." Molly Ringwald, who had also wanted to play Sloane, said, "John wouldn't let me do it: he said that the part wasn't big enough for me."

Ruck had auditioned for the role of Bender in The Breakfast Club that went to Judd Nelson, but Hughes remembered Ruck and cast him as the 17-year-old Cameron Frye. Hughes based the character of Cameron on a friend of his in high school: "He was sort of a lost person. His family neglected him, so he took that as license to really pamper himself. When he was legitimately sick, he actually felt good, because it was difficult and tiring to have to invent diseases but when he actually had something, he was relaxed." Ruck said the role of Cameron had been offered to Emilio Estevez, who turned it down. "Every time I see Emilio, I want to kiss him," said Ruck. "Thank you!" Ruck, then 29, worried about the age difference. (Ruck was only 6 years younger than director Hughes) "I was worried that I'd be 10 years out of step, and I wouldn't know anything about what was cool, what was hip, all that junk. But when I was going to high school, I didn't know any of that stuff then, either. So I just thought, well, hell—I'll just be me. The character, he's such a loner that he really wouldn't give a damn about that stuff anyway. He'd feel guilty that he didn't know it, but that's it." Ruck was not surprised to find himself cast young. "No, because, really, when I was 18, I sort of looked 12," he said. "Maybe it's a genetic imbalance."

Ruck and Broderick had previously acted together in the Broadway production of Biloxi Blues. Cameron's "Mr. Peterson" voice was an in-joke imitation of their former director Gene Saks. Ruck felt at ease working with Broderick, often sleeping in his trailer. "We didn't have to invent an instant friendship like you often have to do in a movie," said Ruck. "We were friends."

Jones was cast as Rooney based on his role in Amadeus, where he played the emperor; Hughes thought that character's modern equivalent was Rooney. "My part was actually quite small in the script, but what seemed to be the important part to me was that I was the only one who wasn't swept along by Ferris," recalls Jones. "So I was the only one in opposition, which presented a lot of opportunities, some of which weren't even in the script or were expanded on. John was receptive to anything I had to offer, and indeed got ideas along the way himself. So that was fun, working with him." "Hughes told me at the time—and I thought he was just blowing his own horn—he said, 'You are going to be known for this for the rest of your life.' And I thought, 'Sure'... but he was right." To help Jones study for the part, Hughes took him to meet his old vice principal. "This is the guy I want you to pay close attention to," Jones explained to Hughes' biographer Kirk Honeycutt. While meeting him, the VP's coat momentarily flew open revealing a holster and gun attached to the man's belt. This made Jones realize what Hughes had envisioned. "The guy was 'Sign up for the Army quick before I kill you!'" Jones exclaimed.

Stein says he got the role of Bueller's Economics teacher through six degrees of separation. "Richard Nixon introduced me to a man named Bill Safire, who's a New York Times columnist. He introduced me to a guy who's an executive at Warner Brothers. He introduced me to a guy who's a casting director. He introduced me to John Hughes. John Hughes and I are among the only Republicans in the picture business, and John Hughes put me in the movie," Stein said. Hughes said that Stein was an easy and early choice for the role of the teacher: "He wasn't a professional actor. He had a flat voice, he looked like a teacher."

Filming

"Chicago is what I am," said Hughes. "A lot of Ferris is sort of my love letter to the city. And the more people who get upset with the fact that I film there, the more I'll make sure that's exactly where I film. It's funny—nobody ever says anything to Woody Allen about always filming in New York. America has this great reverence for New York. I look at it as this decaying horror pit. So let the people in Chicago enjoy Ferris Bueller."

For the film, Hughes got the chance to take a more expansive look at the city he grew up in. "We took a helicopter up the Chicago River. This is the first chance I'd really had to get outside while making a movie. Up to this point, the pictures had been pretty small. I really wanted to capture as much of Chicago as I could, not just the architecture and the landscape, but the spirit." Shooting began in Chicago on September 9, 1985. In late October 1985, the production moved to Los Angeles, and shooting ended on November 22. The Von Steuben Day Parade scene was filmed on September 28. Scenes were filmed at several locations in downtown Chicago and Winnetka (Ferris's home, his mother's real estate office, etc.). Many of the other scenes were filmed in Northbrook, Illinois, including at Glenbrook North High School. The exterior of Ferris's house is located at 4160 Country Club Drive, Long Beach, California, which, at the time of filming, was the childhood home of Judge Thad Balkman.

The modernist house of Cameron Frye is located in Highland Park, Illinois. Known as the Ben Rose House, it was designed by architects A. James Speyer, who designed the main building in 1954, and David Haid, who designed the pavilion in 1974. It was once owned by photographer Ben Rose, who had a car collection in the pavilion. In the film, Cameron's father is portrayed as owning a Ferrari 250 GT California in the same pavilion. According to Lake Forest College art professor Franz Shulze, during the filming of the scene where the Ferrari crashes out of the window, Haid explained to Hughes that he could prevent the car from damaging the rest of the pavilion. Haid fixed connections in the wall and the building remained intact. Haid said to Hughes afterward, "You owe me $25,000,” and which Hughes paid. In the DVD commentary for the film, Hughes mentions that they had to remove every pane of glass from the house to film the car crash scene, since every pane was weakened by age and had acquired a similar tint, hence replacement panels would be obvious. Hughes added that they were able to use the house because producer Ned Tanen knew the owner because they were both Ferrari collectors.

According to Hughes, the scene at the Art Institute of Chicago was "a self-indulgent scene of mine—which was a place of refuge for me, I went there quite a bit, I loved it. I knew all the paintings, the building. This was a chance for me to go back into this building and show the paintings that were my favorite." The museum had not been shot in, until the producers of the film approached them. "I remember Hughes saying, 'There are going to be more works of art in this movie than there have ever been before,'" recalled Jennifer Grey. Among notable works featured in this scene include A Sunday Afternoon on the Island of La Grande Jatte (Georges Seurat, 1884), during which Cameron struggles to find his identity in the face of one of the children in the painting, and America Windows (Marc Chagall, 1977), in front of which Ferris and Sloane have a romantic moment.

According to editor Paul Hirsch, in the original cut, the museum scene fared poorly at test screenings until he switched sequences around and Hughes changed the soundtrack.

The music used for the final version of the museum sequence is an instrumental cover version of The Smiths' "Please Please Please Let Me Get What I Want", performed by The Dream Academy. A passionate Beatles fan, Hughes makes multiple references to them and John Lennon in the script. During filming, Hughes "listened to The White Album every single day for fifty-six days." Hughes also pays tribute to his childhood hero Gordie Howe with Cameron's Detroit Red Wings jersey. "I sent them the jersey,” said Howe. "It was nice seeing the No. 9 on the big screen."

Car

In the film, Ferris convinces Cameron to borrow his father's rare 1961 Ferrari 250 GT California Spyder. "The insert shots of the Ferrari were of the real 250 GT California," Hughes explains in the DVD commentary. "The cars we used in the wide shots were obviously reproductions. There were only 100 of these cars, so it was way too expensive to destroy. We had a number of replicas made. They were pretty good, but for the tight shots I needed a real one, so we brought one in to the stage and shot the inserts with it."

Prior to filming, Hughes learned about Modena Design and Development that produced the Modena Spyder California, a replica of the Ferrari 250 GT. Hughes saw a mention of the company in a car magazine and decided to research them. Neil Glassmoyer recalls the day Hughes contacted him to ask about seeing the Modena Spyder:

Automobile restorationist Mark Goyette designed the kits for three reproductions used in the film and chronicled the whereabouts of the cars today:
 "Built by Goyette and leased to Paramount for the filming. It's the one that jumps over the camera, and is used in almost every shot. At the end of filming, Paramount returned it to Goyette, with the exhaust crushed and cracks in the body. "There was quite a bit of superficial damage, but it held up amazingly well,"  he said. He rebuilt it, and sold it to a young couple in California. The husband later ran it off the road, and Goyette rebuilt the front end for him. That owner sold it in the mid-90s, and it turned up again around 2000, but hasn't emerged since."
 "Sold to Paramount as a kit for them to assemble as their stunt car, they did such a poor job that it was basically unusable, aside from going backwards out the window of Cameron's house. Rebuilt, it ended up at Planet Hollywood in Minneapolis and was moved to Planet Hollywood in Cancun when this one was closed."
 "Another kit, supposed to be built as a shell for the out the window scene, it was never completed at all, and disappeared after the film was completed. Goyette thinks he once heard it was eventually completed and sold off, but it could also still be in a back lot at Paramount."

The "replicar" was "universally hated by the crew," said Ruck. "It didn't work right." The scene in which Ferris turns off the car to leave it with the garage attendant had to be shot a dozen times because it would not start. The car was built with a real wheel base, but used a Ford V8 engine instead of a V12. At the time of filming, the original 250 GT California model was worth $350,000. The vanity plate of Cameron's dad's Ferrari spells NRVOUS and the other plates seen in the film are homages to Hughes's earlier works, VCTN (National Lampoon's Vacation), TBC (The Breakfast Club), MMOM (Mr. Mom), as well as 4FBDO (Ferris Bueller's Day Off).

Economics lecture
Ben Stein's famous monotonous lecture about the Smoot–Hawley Tariff Act was not originally in Hughes's script. Stein, by happenstance, was lecturing off-camera to the amusement of the student cast. "I was just going to do it off camera, but the student extras laughed so hard when they heard my voice that (Hughes) said do it on camera, improvise, something you know a lot about. When I gave the lecture about supply-side economics, I thought they were applauding. Everybody on the set applauded. I thought they were applauding because they had learned something about supply-side economics. But they were applauding because they thought I was boring. ... It was the best day of my life," Stein said.

Parade scene
The parade scene took multiple days of filming; Broderick spent some time practicing the dance moves. "I was very scared,” Broderick said. "Fortunately, the sequence was carefully choreographed beforehand. We worked out all the moves by rehearsing in a little studio. It was shot on two Saturdays in the heart of downtown Chicago. The first day was during a real parade, and John got some very long shots. Then radio stations carried announcements inviting people to take part in 'a John Hughes movie'. The word got around fast and 10,000 people showed up! For the final shot, I turned around and saw a river of people. I put my hands up at the end of the number and heard this huge roar. I can understand how rock stars feel. That kind of reaction feeds you."

Broderick's moves were choreographed by Kenny Ortega (who later choreographed Dirty Dancing). Much of it had to be scrapped though as Broderick had injured his knee badly during the scenes of running through neighbors' backyards. "I was pretty sore,” Broderick said. "I got well enough to do what you see in the parade there, but I couldn't do most of Kenny Ortega's knee spins and things like that that we had worked on. When we did shoot it, we had all this choreography and I remember John would yell with a megaphone, 'Okay, do it again, but don't do any of the choreography,' because he wanted it to be a total mess." "Danke Schoen" was somewhat choreographed but for "Twist and Shout", Broderick said, "we were just making everything up," Hughes explained that much of the scene was spontaneously filmed. "It just happened that this was an actual parade, which we put our float into—unbeknownst to anybody, all the people on the reviewing stand. Nobody knew what it was, including the governor."

Wrigley Field

Wrigley Field is featured in two interwoven and consecutive scenes. In the first scene, Rooney is looking for Ferris at a pizza joint while the voice of Harry Caray announces the action of a ballgame that is being shown on TV. From the play-by-play descriptions, the uniforms, and the player numbers, this game has been identified as the June 5, 1985, game between the Atlanta Braves and the Chicago Cubs.

In the next scene, Sloane, Cameron, and Ferris are in the left field stands inside Wrigley. Ferris flexes his hand in pain after supposedly catching the foul ball. During this scene, the characters enjoy the game and joke about what they would be doing if they had played by the rules. All these "in the park" shots, including the one from the previous scene where Ferris catches the foul ball on TV, were filmed on September 24, 1985, at a game between the Montreal Expos and the Cubs. During the 1985 season, the Braves and the Expos both wore powder blue uniforms during their road games so, with seamless editing by Hirsch, it is difficult to distinguish that the game being seen and described in the pizza joint is not only a different game but also a different Cubs' opponent than the one filmed inside the stadium.

On October 1, 2011, Wrigley Field celebrated the 25th anniversary of the film by showing it on three giant screens on the infield.

Deleted scenes
Several scenes were cut from the final film; one lost scene titled "The Isles of Langerhans" has the three teenagers trying to order in the French restaurant, shocked to discover pancreas on the menu (although in the finished film, Ferris still says, "We ate pancreas,” while recapping the day). This is featured on the Bueller, Bueller Edition DVD. Other scenes were never made available on any DVD version. These scenes included additional screen time with Jeannie in a locker room, Ferris's younger brother and sister (both of whom were completely removed from the film), and additional lines of dialogue throughout the film, all of which can be seen in the original theatrical trailer. Hughes had also wanted to film a scene where Ferris, Sloane, and Cameron go to a strip club. Paramount executives told him there were only so many shooting days left, so the scene was scrapped.

According to former vice president of production for Paramount Pictures Lindsay Doran, an earlier version of the film included a line by Sloane to Cameron during the parade scene when they are discussing their future that resulted in very low scores from young female viewers during test screenings. In the scene, Sloane said, "A girl can always bail out and have a baby and get some guy to support her." "Girls hated that line," Doran recalls. "It was meant as an ironic criticism of gender politics," explained producer Tom Jacobson. "But it went over the heads of the audience and they thought maybe she was espousing them." After cutting the line, Doran said young female test scores skyrocketed approximately 40 points, which was the most dramatic test screening improvement through cutting a single line that she had ever seen.

Music

Limited edition fan club soundtrack
An official soundtrack was not originally released for the film, since director John Hughes felt the songs would not work well together as a continuous album. However, according to an interview with Lollipop Magazine, Hughes noted that he had sent 100,000 7" vinyl singles containing two songs featured in the film to members of his fan mailing list.

Hughes gave further details about his refusal to release a soundtrack in the Lollipop interview:

Songs in the film
Songs featured in the film include:
 "Love Missile F1-11" (Extended Version) by Sigue Sigue Sputnik
 "Jeannie" (Theme from I Dream of Jeannie)
 "Beat City" by The Flowerpot Men
 "Main Title / Rebel Blockade Runner" by John Williams (from Star Wars)
 "Please Please Please Let Me Get What I Want" (instrumental) by The Dream Academy (a cover version of a song by The Smiths)
 "The Celebrated Minuet" by Luigi Boccherini (performed by the Zagreb Philharmonic Chamber Studio)
 "Danke Schoen" by Wayne Newton
 "Twist and Shout" by The Beatles
 "Radio People" by Zapp
 "I'm Afraid" by Blue Room
 "Taking the Day Off" by General Public
 "The Edge of Forever" by The Dream Academy
 "March of the Swivelheads" (a remix of "Rotating Heads") by The Beat (British band)
 "Oh Yeah" by Yello
 "BAD" by Big Audio Dynamite

"Danke Schoen" is one of the recurring motifs in the film and is sung by Ferris, Ed Rooney, and Jeannie. Hughes called it the "most awful song of my youth. Every time it came on, I just wanted to scream, claw my face. I was taking German in high school—which meant that we listened to it in school. I couldn't get away from it." According to Broderick, Ferris's singing "Danke Schoen" in the shower was his idea. "Although it's only because of the brilliance of John's deciding that I should sing "Danke Schoen" on the float in the parade. I had never heard the song before. I was learning it for the parade scene. So we're doing the shower scene and I thought, 'Well, I can do a little rehearsal.' And I did something with my hair to make that Mohawk. And you know what good directors do: they say; 'Stop! Wait until we roll.' And John put that stuff in."

Wayne Newton told the Chicago Sun-Times he was thrilled to have his song featured in the film. "It was really cool because I thought, okay, 'Danke Schoen' had run its gamut. When I saw [Broderick] doing an impression, lip syncing to my version of the song, I thought that was the coolest thing I had ever seen."

2016 soundtrack

The soundtrack for the film, limited to 5,000 copies, was released on September 13, 2016 by La-La Land Records. The album includes new wave and pop songs featured in the film, as well as Ira Newborn's complete score, including unused cues. Due to licensing restrictions, "Twist and Shout," "Taking The Day Off," and "March of the Swivelheads" were not included, but are available elsewhere. The Flowerpot Men's "Beat City" makes its first official release on CD with a new mix done by The Flowerpot Men's Ben Watkins and Adam Peters that differs from the original 7" fan club release.

Reception

Critical response
The film largely received positive reviews from critics. Roger Ebert gave it three out of four stars, calling it "one of the most innocent movies in a long time," and "a sweet, warm-hearted comedy." Richard Roeper called the film: "one of my favorite movies of all time. It has one of the highest 'repeatability' factors of any film I've ever seen... I can watch it again and again. There's also this, and I say it in all sincerity: Ferris Bueller's Day Off is something of a suicide prevention film, or at the very least a story about a young man trying to help his friend gain some measure of self-worth... Ferris has made it his mission to show Cameron that the whole world in front of him is passing him by, and that life can be pretty sweet if you wake up and embrace it. That's the lasting message of Ferris Bueller's Day Off." Roeper pays homage to the film with a license plate that reads "SVFRRIS".

Conservative columnist George Will hailed Ferris as "the moviest movie," a film "most true to the general spirit of the movies, the spirit of effortless escapism." Essayist Steve Almond called Ferris "the most sophisticated teen movie [he] had ever seen," adding that while Hughes had made a lot of good movies, Ferris was the "one film [he] would consider true art, [the] only one that reaches toward the ecstatic power of teendom and, at the same time, exposes the true, piercing woe of that age." Almond also applauded Ruck's performance, going so far as saying he deserved the Academy Award for Best Supporting Actor of 1986: "His performance is what elevates the film, allows it to assume the power of a modern parable."  The New York Times reviewer Nina Darnton criticized Mia Sara's portrayal of Sloane for lacking "the specific detail that characterized the adolescent characters in Hughes's other films," asserting she "created a basically stable but forgettable character." Conversely, Darnton praised Ruck and Grey's performances: "The two people who grow in the movie—Cameron, played with humor and sensitivity by Alan Ruck, and Ferris's sister Jeannie, played with appropriate self-pity by Jennifer Grey—are the most authentic. Grey manages to play an insufferably sulky teen-ager who is still attractive and likable."

Co-star Ben Stein was exceptionally moved by the film, calling it "the most life-affirming movie possibly of the entire post-war period." "This is to comedies what Gone with the Wind is to epics," Stein added. "It will never die, because it responds to and calls forth such human emotions. It isn't dirty. There's nothing mean-spirited about it. There's nothing sneering or sniggering about it. It's just wholesome. We want to be free. We want to have a good time. We know we're not going to be able to all our lives. We know we're going to have to buckle down and work. We know we’re going to have to eventually become family men and women, and have responsibilities and pay our bills. But just give us a couple of good days that we can look back on."

National Review writer Mark Hemingway lauded the film's celebration of liberty. "If there's a better celluloid expression of ordinary American freedom than Ferris Bueller's Day Off, I have yet to see it. If you could take one day and do absolutely anything, piling into a convertible with your best girl and your best friend and taking in a baseball game, an art museum, and a fine meal seems about as good as it gets," wrote Hemingway.

Others were less enamored of Ferris, many taking issue with the film's "rebel without a cause" hedonism. David Denby of New York Magazine, called the film "a nauseating distillation of the slack, greedy side of Reaganism." Author Christina Lee agreed, adding it was a "splendidly ridiculous exercise in unadulterated indulgence," and the film "encapsulated the Reagan era's near solipsist worldview and insatiable appetite for immediate gratification—of living in and for the moment..." Gene Siskel panned the film from a Chicago-centric perspective, saying: "Ferris Bueller doesn't do anything much fun ... [t]hey don't even sit in the bleachers where all the kids like to sit when they go to Cubs games." Siskel did enjoy the chemistry between Jennifer Grey and Charlie Sheen. Ebert thought Siskel was too eager to find flaws in the film's view of Chicago.

On Rotten Tomatoes, the film has an approval rating of 81% based on 73 critics' reviews, with an average rating of 7.70/10. The website's critical consensus reads: "Matthew Broderick charms in Ferris Bueller's Day Off, a light and irrepressibly fun movie about being young and having fun." Metacritic gave the film a score of 61 based on 13 reviews, indicating "generally favorable reviews". Audiences polled by CinemaScore gave the film an average grade of "A−" on an A+ to F scale.

Accolades
Broderick was nominated for a Golden Globe Award in 1987 for Best Actor – Motion Picture Musical or Comedy.

Box office
The film opened in 1,330 theaters in the United States, and had a total weekend gross of $6,275,647 . Opening at No. 2. Ferris Bueller's Day Off total gross in the United States was approximately $70,136,369, making it a box office success. It subsequently became the 10th-highest-grossing film of 1986.

Rankings
As an influential and popular film, Ferris Bueller's Day Off has been included in many film rating lists. The film is number 54 on Bravo's "100 Funniest Movies", came 26th in the British 50 Greatest Comedy Films and ranked number 10 on Entertainment Weekly's list of the "50 Best High School Movies".

Cultural influence

U.S. President Ronald Reagan viewed the film at Camp David on June 21, 1986.

Hughes said of Bueller, "That kid will either become President of the United States or go to prison." First Lady Barbara Bush paraphrased the film in her 1990 commencement address at Wellesley College: "Find the joy in life, because as Ferris Bueller said on his day off, 'Life moves pretty fast; if you don't stop and look around once in a while, you could miss it!'" Responding to the audience's enthusiastic applause, she added "I'm not going to tell George you clapped more for Ferris than you clapped for George."

Other phrases from Ferris Bueller's Day Off such as Stein's monotone-voiced "Bueller? ...Bueller? ...Bueller?" (while taking roll call in class), and "Anyone? Anyone?" (trying to probe the students for answers) as well as Kristy Swanson's cheerful "No problem whatsoever!" also permeated popular culture. In fact, Stein's monotone performance launched his acting career. In 2016, Stein reprised the attendance scene in a campaign ad for Iowa Senator Charles Grassley; Stein intoned the last name of Grassley's opponent (Patty Judge), to silence, while facts about her missed votes and absences from state board meetings were listed. Stein then calls out "Grassley," which gets a response; Stein mutters, "He's always here."

Broderick said of the Ferris Bueller role, "It eclipsed everything, I should admit, and to some degree it still does." Later at the 2010 Oscar tribute to Hughes, he said, "For the past 25 years, nearly every day someone comes up to me, taps me on the shoulder and says, 'Hey, Ferris, is this your day off?'"

Ruck says that with Cameron Frye, Hughes gave him "the best part I ever had in a movie, and any success that I've had since 1985 is because he took a big chance on me. I'll be forever grateful." "While we were making the movie, I just knew I had a really good part", Ruck says. "My realization of John's impact on the teen-comedy genre crept in sometime later. Teen comedies tend to dwell on the ridiculous, as a rule. It's always the preoccupation with sex and the self-involvement, and we kind of hold the kids up for ridicule in a way. Hughes added this element of dignity. He was an advocate for teenagers as complete human beings, and he honored their hopes and their dreams. That's what you see in his movies."

Matthew Broderick reprises his role of Ferris Bueller in the end credits for She's Having a Baby. He is among the people that pitch the names of Jake and Kristy's baby son.

Broderick starred in a television advertisement prepared by Honda promoting its CR-V for the 2012 Super Bowl XLVI. The ad pays homage to Ferris Bueller, featuring Broderick (as himself) faking illness to skip out of work to enjoy sightseeing around Los Angeles. Several elements, such as the use of the song "Oh Yeah", and a valet monotonously calling for "Broderick... Broderick...", appear in the ad. A teaser for the ad had appeared two weeks prior to the Super Bowl, which had created rumors of a possible film sequel. It was produced by Santa Monica-based RPA and directed by Todd Phillips. AdWeek's Tim Nudd called the ad "a great homage to the original 1986 film, with Broderick this time calling in sick to a film shoot and enjoying another day of slacking." On the other hand, Jalopniks Matt Hardigree called the spot "sacrilegious".

The film has been parodied in television series, with characters taking a day off from their normal routine to have a day of adventure. Examples include the episodes "Barry's Day Off" from The Goldbergs, "Brian Finch's Black Op" from Limitless, and "Turner's and Brenda's Day Off" from South Side.

In March 2017, Domino's Pizza began an advertising campaign parodying the film, featuring actor Joe Keery in the lead role.

Early in 2020, internet personality Zach King released a short film parody on his YouTube channel.

In September 2020, LiftMaster released a commercial where two young boys attempt to drive a 1966 Jaguar E-Type owned by the father of one of the boys. The commercial, advertising the Liftmaster Secure View, a security system built into the device, features Alan Ruck as an older Cameron Frye, who warns the boys after catching them on camera. He then speaks to the audience "Been there, done that."

Music

The film's influence in popular culture extends beyond the film itself to how musical elements of the film have been received as well, for example, Yello's song "Oh Yeah". As Jonathan Bernstein explains, "Never a hit, this slice of Swiss-made tomfoolery with its varispeed vocal effects and driving percussion was first used by John Hughes to illustrate the mouthwatering must-haveness of Cameron's dad's Ferrari. Since then, it has become synonymous with avarice. Every time a movie, TV show or commercial wants to underline the jaw-dropping impact of a hot babe or sleek auto, that synth-drum starts popping and that deep voice rumbles, 'Oh yeah . . .'" Yello was unheard of in the United States at the time, but the inclusion of their song in Ferris Bueller and The Secret of My Success the following year sparked great interest in the song, where it reached the Billboard Hot 100 and US Dance charts in 1987. It often became referred to as "the Ferris Bueller song" due to its attachment with the movie. Dieter Meier of Yello was able to use the licensing fees from "Oh Yeah" appearance in Ferris Bueller and other films to start a series of investments and amassed a large fortune.

Concerning the influence of another song used in the film, Roz Kaveney writes that some "of the finest moments in later teen film draw on Ferris's blithe Dionysian fervour — the elaborate courtship by song in 10 Things I Hate About You (1999) draws usefully on the "Twist and Shout" sequence in Ferris Bueller's Day Off". "Twist and Shout" charted again, 16 years after the Beatles broke up, as a result of its prominent appearance in both this film and Back to School (where Rodney Dangerfield performs a cover version) which was released the same weekend as Ferris Bueller's Day Off. The re-released single reached No. 23 in the U.S; a US-only compilation album containing the track The Early Beatles, re-entered the album charts at No. 197. The version heard in the film includes brass overdubbed onto the Beatles' original recording, which did not go down well with Paul McCartney. "I liked [the] film but they overdubbed some lousy brass on the stuff! If it had needed brass, we'd had stuck it on ourselves!" Upon hearing McCartney's reaction, Hughes felt bad for "offend[ing] a Beatle. But it wasn't really part of the song. We saw a band [onscreen] and we needed to hear the instruments."

The bands Save Ferris and Rooney were named in allusion to Ferris Bueller's Day Off.

Academic analysis
Many scholars have discussed at length the film's depiction of academia and youth culture. For Martin Morse Wooster, the film "portrayed teachers as humorless buffoons whose only function was to prevent teenagers from having a good time.”
Regarding not specifically teachers, but rather a type of adult characterization in general, Art Silverblatt asserts that the "adults in Ferris Bueller's Day Off are irrelevant and impotent. Ferris's nemesis, the school disciplinarian, Mr. Rooney, is obsessed with 'getting Bueller.' His obsession emerges from envy. Strangely, Ferris serves as Rooney's role model, as he clearly possesses the imagination and power that Rooney lacks. ... By capturing and disempowering Ferris, Rooney hopes to ... reduce Ferris's influence over other students, which would reestablish adults, that is, Rooney, as traditional authority figures." Nevertheless, Silverblatt concludes that "Rooney is essentially a comedic figure, whose bumbling attempts to discipline Ferris are a primary source of humor in the film.” Thomas Patrick Doherty writes that "the adult villains in teenpics such as ... Ferris Bueller's Day Off (1986) are overdrawn caricatures, no real threat; they're played for laughs.” Yet Silverblatt also remarks that casting "the principal as a comic figure questions the competence of adults to provide young people with effective direction—indeed, the value of adulthood itself.”

Adults are not the stars or main characters of the film, and Roz Kaveney notes that what "Ferris Bueller brings to the teen genre, ultimately, is a sense of how it is possible to be cool and popular without being rich or a sports hero. Unlike the heroes of Weird Science, Ferris is computer savvy without being a nerd or a geek—it is a skill he has taken the trouble to learn."

In 2010, English comedian Dan Willis performed his show "Ferris Bueller's Way Of..." at the Edinburgh Festival, delving into the philosophy of the movie and looking for life answers within.

Home media and other releases

The film has been released on DVD three times; including on October 19, 1999, on January 10, 2006, as the Bueller... Bueller edition, and the I Love the '80s edition August 19, 2008. The original DVD, like most Paramount Pictures films released on DVD for the first time, has very few bonus features, but it does feature a commentary by Hughes. Though this is no longer available for sale, the director's commentary is available. The DVD was issued in the United States on October 19, 1999, the United Kingdom on July 31, 2000, Germany on August 3, 2000, Denmark on August 9, 2000, Brazil on June 25, 2001, and Canada on March 9, 2004. The North American DVDs include a Dolby Digital 5.1 Surround Sound English audio track, a mono version of the French dub, and English subtitles. The German, Danish, and UK DVD includes the English and French audio as well as mono dubs in German, Italian, and Spanish. The German and Danish release features English, French, German, Portuguese, Bulgarian, Croatian, Danish, Dutch, Finnish, Icelandic, Norwegian, Swedish, and Turkish subtitles, the UK including those minus the Finnish subtitles and plus the Romanian subs. The Brazilian DVD only has the English audio and English, Portuguese and Spanish subtitles.

The Bueller... Bueller DVD re-release has several more bonus features, but does not contain the commentary track of the original DVD release. The edition was released in the United States on January 10, 2006, Sweden on April 12, 2006, Spain on April 18, 2006, and the United Kingdom on May 29, 2006. The I Love the '80s edition is identical to the first DVD release (no features aside from commentary), but includes a bonus CD with songs from the 1980s. The songs are not featured in the film. The Bueller... Bueller edition has multiple bonus features such as interviews with the cast and crew, along with a clip of Stein's commentaries on the film's philosophy and impact.

Bueller... Bueller... editions were also the first Blu-ray releases of Ferris Bueller's Day Off. Blu-rays of the edition were released in the United States and Canada on May 5, 2009; Australia on June 16, 2009; Brazil on July 20, 2009; and United Kingdom on February 1, 2010. All of these Blu-rays feature a Dolby TrueHD audio track of the English version, with mono versions of the French and Spanish dubs; they also include English, French, Spanish and Portuguese subtitles. A 25th anniversary edition for DVD and Blu-ray were both released on August 2, 2011, in North America.

On October 18, 2004, Ferris Bueller's Day Off was issued as part of a UK Digipack DVD collection by Paramount Pictures named I Love 80s Movies: John Hughes Classic 80s, which also included Pretty in Pink (1986), Planes, Trains, and Automobiles (1987), and Some Kind of Wonderful (1987). It was later part of the United States Warner Bros. DVD set 5 Film Collection: 80's Comedy, issued on September 30, 2014, and also including Planes, Trains and Automobiles, The Naked Gun: From the Files of Police Squad! (1988), Airplane! (1980), and Police Academy (1984); the collection also included digital files of the films. On October 3, 2017, it was released in the United States as part of the DVD collection 5 Iconic Films of the 80s that also included The Naked Gun, Some Kind of Wonderful, Crocodile Dundee (1986), and Harlem Nights (1989).  The film also appeared on two Blu-ray collections: Australia's Films That Define A Decade – 80s Collection released on April 12, 2017, and France's Pop Culture Anthology 20 Films Cultes Blu-ray issued on October 17, 2018.

In the United Kingdom, an 80s Collection edition with new artwork was released on DVD in 2018 with the same six bonus features as the 2006 issue.

In 2016 Paramount, Turner Classic Movies, and Fathom Events re-released the film and Pretty in Pink to celebrate their 30th anniversary.

Most Blu-ray debuts of Ferris Bueller's Day Off in most foreign-language countries took place in 2019; the film was released to the format in France on January 9, 2019, Germany on February 7, 2019, Italy on March 13, 2019, Japan on April 24, 2019, and Spain on May 3, 2019. The Italy, Germany, and Spain Blu-rays includes French, German, Italian, and Spanish dubs; and Italian, English, French, German, Japanese, Spanish, Danish, Dutch, Finnish, Norwegian, and Swedish subtitles. The French and Japanese Blu-rays, however, are limited to subtitle and audio options of their respective languages. VHS retro packing Blu-ray editions of the film have only been issued as retailer exclusives. In Australia on December 6, 2017, JB Hi-Fi issued a 1000-copies-only "Rewind Collection" edition of the VHS-retro-packaged Blu-ray that also includes a DVD disc, a toy figure, props from the film, and other memorabilia. On July 30, 2018, HMV exclusively released the same limited edition in the United Kingdom.

Follow-ups

Interquel
Broderick and Hughes stayed in touch for a while after production. "We thought about a sequel to Ferris Bueller, where he'd be in college or at his first job, and the same kind of things would happen again. But neither of us found a very exciting hook to that. The movie is about a singular time in your life." "Ferris Bueller is about the week before you leave school, it's about the end of school— in some way, it doesn't have a sequel. It's a little moment and it's a lightning flash in your life. I mean, you could try to repeat it in college or something but it's a time that you don't keep. So that's partly why I think we couldn't think of another," Broderick added.

"But just for fun," said Ruck, "I used to think why don't they wait until Matthew and I are in our seventies and do Ferris Bueller Returns and have Cameron be in a nursing home. He doesn't really need to be there, but he just decided his life is over, so he committed himself to a nursing home. And Ferris comes and breaks him out. And they go to, like, a titty bar and all this ridiculous stuff happens. And then, at the end of the movie, Cameron dies."

In August 2022, a spin-off interquel film entitled Sam & Victor's Day Off, was announced to be in development for the streaming service Paramount+. Taking place during the events of Ferris Bueller's Day Off and focusing on the two titular valets who took Cameron's father's 1961 Ferrari 250 GT California Spyder on a joy ride (originally portrayed in the film by Richard Edson and Larry "Flash" Jenkins), the film would be produced by Jon Hurwitz, Hayden Schlossberg, and Josh Heald, and written by Bill Posley.

Television series

In 1990, a television series titled Ferris Bueller started airing on NBC. It starred Charlie Schlatter as Ferris Bueller and Jennifer Aniston as Jeannie Bueller. Jennifer Aniston and Jennifer Grey would subsequently appear together in one episode of the sitcom Friends, their characters (Rachel and Mindy) being the former and current fiancée of Barry Farber. Mindy returns in one further episode but played by another actress.

References

External links

 
 
 
 
 

1980s teen comedy films
1986 films
American coming-of-age comedy films
American high school films
American teen comedy films
Films about educators
Films adapted into television shows
Films directed by John Hughes (filmmaker)
Films produced by John Hughes (filmmaker)
Films scored by Ira Newborn
Films set in Chicago
Films shot in Chicago
Paramount Pictures films
Films with screenplays by John Hughes (filmmaker)
United States National Film Registry films
1986 comedy films
Films set in museums
Chicago Cubs
1980s English-language films
1980s American films
English-language comedy films